Date certain is a legal term for the date on or by which the actions of a contract can be reasonably completed, and is considered to be legally binding.

Legal terminology